is a feminine given name of Japanese origin. It can be written with the characters for know; wisdom (machi) and child (ko), although it can have a number of other different meanings depending on which kanji characters are used to write it. Machiko may also be written using the katakana or hiragana writing systems.

Possible writings
真智子, "true, wisdom, child"
真千子, "true, thousand, child"
真治子, "true, govern, child"
茉千子, "jasmine, thousand, child"
舞稚子, "dance, young, child"
舞地子, "dance, earth, child"
茉茅子, "jasmine, miscanthus, child"
茉智子, "jasmine, wisdom, child"

People with the name
, Japanese badminton player
, Japanese manga artist
, Japanese voice actress
, Japanese actress
, Japanese triathlete
 a Japanese noble lady, scholar and memoirist, member of the Ōgimachi family of court nobles during the Edo period. 
, Japanese actress
, better known by her stage name Machico, Japanese singer and voice actress
, Japanese manga artist
, Japanese actress and voice actress
, Japanese idol and singer
, Japanese manga artist
, Japanese actress and voice actress
, Japanese figure skater and coach

Fictional characters
, a character from the Japanese newspaper comic strip Sazae-san
, main character of the Miss Machiko manga and anime series
, protagonist of the Aliens vs. Predator novel series

See also
Machiko Raheem (මචිකෝ රහීම්, born 1996), Sri Lankan swimmer

References

Japanese feminine given names